Phyllospora comosa, known as crayweed, is a species of brown algae in the Seirococcaceae family that is a type of temperate seaweed forest important as habitat for many marine species and also for producing oxygen and capturing atmospheric carbon. It is found in the oceans around Australia and New Zealand. It used to occur around Sydney but has disappeared from metropolitan areas under pressure from human activities during the 1970s and 1980s.

Some laterals have conceptacles, in which develop cells which produce sperm and eggs. The strongly seasonal growth of the algae depends on the length of daylight; it occurs from apical cells and is restricted to the top  of the branches.

Conservation efforts in Sydney 
A conservation effort known as "The Crayweed Project" or "Operation Crayweed" is working to re-establish the species in the waters around Sydney.  Transplants have been established at sites including Malabar, Coogee, Little Bay, Freshwater and Bondi; other transplants are planned for Newport and Dee Why.

References

Further reading
 
 
 Shepherd, Scoresby, Graham Edgar (eds), and CSIRO., (2013) Issuing Body. Ecology of Australian Temperate Reefs: The Unique South Collingwood, Victoria, CSIRO. 

Fucales